Streptomyces filipinensis is a bacterium species from the genus of Streptomyces which has been isolated from soil on the Philippines. Streptomyces filipinensis produces pentalenolactone I, hygromycin A and filipin.

Further reading

See also 
 List of Streptomyces species

References

External links
Type strain of Streptomyces filipinensis at BacDive -  the Bacterial Diversity Metadatabase

filipinensis
Bacteria described in 1955